Jessica Marie Alba (born April 28, 1981) is an American actress and businesswoman. She began her television and movie appearances at age 13 in Camp Nowhere and The Secret World of Alex Mack (1994), and rose to prominence at age 19 as the lead actress of the television series Dark Angel (2000–2002), for which she received a Golden Globe nomination.

Her big screen breakthrough came in Honey (2003). She soon established herself as a Hollywood actress, and has starred in numerous box office hits throughout her career, including Fantastic Four (2005), Fantastic Four: Rise of the Silver Surfer (2007), Good Luck Chuck (2007), The Eye (2008), Valentine's Day (2010), Little Fockers (2010), and Mechanic: Resurrection (2016). She is a frequent collaborator of director Robert Rodriguez, having starred in Sin City (2005), Machete (2010), Spy Kids: All the Time in the World (2011), Machete Kills (2013), and Sin City: A Dame to Kill For (2014). From 2019 to 2020, Alba starred in the Spectrum action crime series L.A.'s Finest.

In 2011, Alba co-founded The Honest Company, a consumer goods company that sells baby, personal and household products. Magazines including Men's Health, Vanity Fair and FHM have included her on their lists of the world's most beautiful women.

Early life 
Jessica Marie Alba was born in Pomona, California on April 28, 1981, to Catherine Louisa (née Jensen) and Mark David Alba. Her mother has Danish, Welsh, German, English and French ancestry, while her paternal grandparents, who were born in California, were children of Mexican immigrants. She has a younger brother, Joshua. Her third cousin, once removed, is writer Gustavo Arellano. Her father's Air Force career took the family to Biloxi, Mississippi, and Del Rio, Texas, before they settled in Claremont, California when she was nine years old. Alba has described her family as "very conservative… a traditional, Catholic, Latin American family", and herself as very liberal; she says she identified as a "feminist" as early as age five.

Alba's early life was marked by a multitude of physical maladies. During childhood, she suffered from pneumonia four to five times a year and had partially collapsed lungs twice as well as a ruptured appendix and tonsillar cyst. She has also had asthma since she was a child. She became isolated from other children at school because she was hospitalized so often, no one knew her well enough to befriend her. She has said that her family's frequent moving also contributed to her isolation from her peers. She graduated from Claremont High School at age 16 and subsequently attended the Atlantic Theater Company.

Acting career

1992–1999: Beginnings 

Alba expressed an interest in acting from age five. In 1992, the 11-year-old Alba persuaded her mother to take her to an acting competition in Beverly Hills, where the grand prize was free acting classes. She won the grand prize, and took her first acting lessons. An agent signed her nine months later. Her first film appearance was a small role in the 1994 feature Camp Nowhere as Gail. She was originally hired for two weeks but her role turned into a two-month job when one of the prominent actresses dropped out.

Alba appeared in two national television commercials for Nintendo and J. C. Penney as a child. She was later featured in several independent films. She branched out into television in 1994 with a recurring role as the vain Jessica in three episodes of the Nickelodeon comedy series The Secret World of Alex Mack. She then performed the role of Maya in the first two seasons of the 1995 television series Flipper. Under the tutelage of her lifeguard mother, Alba learned to swim before she could walk, and was a PADI-certified scuba diver—skills which were put to use on the show, which was filmed in Australia.

In 1998, she appeared as Melissa Hauer in a first-season episode of the Steven Bochco crime-drama Brooklyn South, as Leanne in two episodes of Beverly Hills, 90210, and as Layla in an episode of Love Boat: The Next Wave. In 1999, she appeared in the Randy Quaid comedy feature P.U.N.K.S.. After Alba graduated from high school, she studied acting with William H. Macy and his wife, Felicity Huffman, at the Atlantic Theater Company, which was developed by Macy and Pulitzer Prize-winning playwright and film director, David Mamet. Alba rose to greater prominence in Hollywood in 1999 after appearing as a member of a snobby high school clique tormenting an insecure copy editor in the romantic comedy Never Been Kissed, opposite Drew Barrymore, and as the female lead in the little-seen comedy horror film Idle Hands, alongside Devon Sawa.

2000–2006: Worldwide recognition 
Her big break came when James Cameron picked Alba from over 1000 candidates for the role of the genetically engineered super-soldier Max Guevara on the FOX sci-fi television series Dark Angel. The series ran for two seasons, until 2002, and earned Alba critical acclaim, a Golden Globe nomination, the Teen Choice Award for Choice Actress, and a Saturn Award for Best Actress. Her role has been cited as a feminist character and is considered a symbol of female empowerment. Writing for the University of Melbourne, Bronwen Auty considered Max "the archetypal modern feminist hero—a young woman empowered to use her body actively to achieve goals", citing Max's refusal to use firearms and instead using martial arts and knowledge as weapons. In 2004, Max was ranked #17 in TV Guides list of "25 Greatest Sci-Fi Legends". Her Dark Angel role led to significant parts in films. She had her big screen breakthrough in 2003 when she starred as an aspiring dancer-choreographer in Honey. Rotten Tomatoes' critical consensus was: "An attractive Jessica Alba and energetic dance numbers provide some lift to this corny and formulaic movie". Budgeted at US$18 million, the film made US$62.2 million.

Alba next played exotic dancer Nancy Callahan, as part of a long ensemble cast, in the neo-noir crime anthology film Sin City (2005), written, produced, and directed by Robert Rodriguez and Frank Miller. It is based on Miller's graphic novel of the same name. She had not heard about the novel prior to her involvement with the film, but was eager to work with Rodriguez. The film was a critical darling and grossed US$158.8 million. She received a MTV Movie Award for Sexiest Performance.

Alba portrayed the Marvel Comics character Invisible Woman in Fantastic Four (also 2005), alongside Ioan Gruffudd, Chris Evans, Michael Chiklis, and Julian McMahon. The Guardian, in its review for the film, noted: "Feminists and non-feminists alike must absorb the Fantastic Four'''s most troubling paradox: having been admitted to the story on the grounds of her beauty, [Alba's] superpower is to be invisible". The film was a commercial success despite negative reviews, grossing US$333.5 million worldwide. At the 2006 MTV Movie Awards, Alba earned nominations for Best Hero and Best On-Screen Team. Her last 2005 film was the thriller Into the Blue, where she portrayed, opposite Paul Walker, one half of a couple who find themselves in trouble with a drug lord after finding the illicit cargo of a sunken airplane. The film saw moderate box office returns, with a US$44.4 million worldwide gross. She hosted the 2006 MTV Movie Awards and performed sketches spoofing the movies King Kong, Mission: Impossible III and The Da Vinci Code.

 2007–2010: Romantic comedies 
Alba reprised her role in Fantastic Four: Rise of the Silver Surfer, released in June 2007. According to Alba, Tim Story's direction during an emotional scene almost made her quit acting. "[He told me] 'It looks too real. It looks too painful. Can you be prettier when you cry? Cry pretty, Jessica.' He was like, 'Don't do that thing with your face. Just make it flat. We can CGI the tears in.'" According to Alba, this experience filled her with self-doubt: "And then it all got me thinking: Am I not good enough? Are my instincts and my emotions not good enough? Do people hate them so much that they don't want me to be a person? Am I not allowed to be a person in my work? And so I just said, 'Fuck it. I don't care about this business anymore.'" The film grossed  globally.

In Good Luck Chuck (also 2007), Alba portrayed the love interest of a womanizer dentist. She posed for one of the Good Luck Chucks theatrical posters parodying the well-known Rolling Stone cover photographed by Annie Leibovitz featuring John Lennon and Yoko Ono in similar poses. While the film was heavily panned by critics, it made almost US$60 million upon its release. Her third starring vehicle in 2007 was the psychological thriller Awake, portraying the girlfriend of a wealthy man who is about to have a heart transplant. Reviews were lukewarm, but Roger Ebert praised her performance, and budgeted at around US$8 million, the film made US$32.7 million.

In February 2008, she hosted the Academy of Motion Picture Arts and Sciences' Science and Technical Awards. Alba made her acting transition to the horror genre in the film The Eye, a remake of the Hong Kong original, in which she obtained the role of a successful classical violinist who receives an eye transplant that allows her to see into the supernatural world. Though the film was not well received by critics, her performance itself received mixed reviews. She garnered a Teen Choice for Choice Movie Actress: Horror–Thriller and a Razzie Award nomination for Worst Actress (shared with The Love Guru). In 2008, she also played a salesgirl in the independent romantic comedy Meet Bill, alongside Logan Lerman and Elizabeth Banks, and starred in the comedy The Love Guru, as a woman who inherits the Toronto Maple Leafs hockey team, opposite Mike Myers and Justin Timberlake. Mick LaSalle, of the San Francisco Chronicle, noting that she was "prominently" in the film, felt that she "finally seems relaxed on camera". The Love Guru was a critical and commercial flop.

While Alba did not have any film release in 2009, five high-profile films released throughout 2010 featured her in significant roles. Her first role in the year was that of a prostitute in The Killer Inside Me, an adaptation of the book of the same name, opposite Kate Hudson and Casey Affleck, which premiered at the Sundance Film Festival to polarized reactions from critics. Her next film was the romantic comedy Valentine's Day, in which she played the girlfriend of a florist as part of a long ensemble cast consisting of Jessica Biel, Bradley Cooper, Taylor Lautner and Julia Roberts, among others. Despite negative reviews, the film was a commercial success, with a worldwide gross of US$216.5 million. In the action film Machete, Alba reunited with director Robert Rodriguez, taking on the role of an immigration officer torn between enforcing the law and doing what is popular in the eyes of her family. Machete made over US$44 million globally.

The drama An Invisible Sign of My Own, which Alba filmed in late 2008, premiered at the Hamptons Film Festival. In it, she portrayed a painfully withdrawn young woman. Her last 2010 film was the comedy Little Fockers, in which she played an extrovert drug representative, reuniting with Robert De Niro, who was also in Machete. Despite negative reviews from critics, the film grossed over US$310 million worldwide. For all her 2010 roles, she received a Razzie Award for Worst Supporting Actress.

 2011–present: action and independent media productions 
In 2011, Alba worked for the third time with Robert Rodriguez in the film Spy Kids: All the Time in the World, portraying a retired spy who is called back into action. To bond with her new stepchildren, she invites them along. The film paled at the box office in comparison to the previous films in the franchise, but was still a moderate success, taking in US$85 million around the globe. Alba next appeared with Adam Scott, Richard Jenkins, Jane Lynch, Mary Elizabeth Winstead, and Catherine O'Hara in the comedy A.C.O.D. (2013), portraying what the Washington Post described as a "fellow child of divorce", with whom Scott's character "almost cheats on" her girlfriend. ScreenRant critic Ben Kendrick wrote: "[Winstead] and [Alba] also deliver in their contributions – though both of their characters are mainly designed to be mirrors for Carter to examine his own life and choices." A.C.O.D. received a limited theatrical run in North America. In 2013, Alba also made her voice acting debut in the moderately successful animated film Escape from Planet Earth.

Alba worked once again with director Rodriguez for two film sequels. She reprised her role of an Immigration Officer, in an uncredited cameo appearance, in Machete Kills (2013), which flopped with critics and audiences, and her much larger role of stripper Nancy Callahan, seeking to avenge her late protector, in Sin City: A Dame to Kill For, which was released in August 2014, on 2D and 3D. Unlike the first film, A Dame to Kill For was a commercial failure, grossing US$39 million against its US$65 million production budget, and received mixed reviews from film critics. Variety felt it was a "late, limp attempt to turn Alba's character from an exploited figure into an empowered one". She next took on the roles of a cabaret show performer in the dramedy Dear Eleanor (2014), the athletic girlfriend of a successful and well-respected English professor in the romantic comedy Some Kind of Beautiful (2014), a receptionist at a limo company in the thriller Stretch (also 2014), an emotionally vulnerable weapons trafficker in the crime comedy Barely Lethal (2015), and that of a documentary filmmaker in the horror film The Veil (2016); all films were released for limited theatrical runs and VOD.

In the action film Mechanic: Resurrection (2016), alongside Jason Statham, Alba played the girlfriend of a retired hitman. She did Krav Maga to get into shape for the film, and was drawn to the strength her character exhibited, remarking: "I think for these types of movies you don't often get to see the female romantic lead kind of kick butt. I mean, it's usually she's being saved by the guy, and so it's nice that I got to come to the table with a toughness, and a real heart". The film made US$125.7 million worldwide.

She will star in and executive produce a new documentary series for Disney+ called "Parenting Without Borders" (working title) which will focus on families around the world and their beliefs and culture.

 Other endeavors 
 The Honest Company 
In January 2012, Alba and business partner Christopher Gavigan launched The Honest Company, selling a collection of household goods, diapers, and body care products. The company was successful, and was valued at US$1 billion .

In early 2013, Alba released her book, The Honest Life, based on her experiences creating a natural, non-toxic life for her family. The book became a New York Times Best Seller. In October 2015, Alba launched a collection of skin care and beauty products called Honest Beauty.

As of April 2022, Alba owned 6.5 percent of the company. She is currently employed as the company's chief creative officer, receiving an annually base salary of $700,000 and restricted stock valued $1,500,000.

 Charity and activism 
Alba posed for a bondage-themed print advertising campaign by Declare Yourself, a campaign encouraging voter registration among youth for the 2008 United States presidential election. The ads, photographed by Mark Liddell, feature Alba wrapped in and gagged with black tape, and drew national media attention. Alba said of doing the advertisements that "it didn't freak me out at all." Alba also said, "I think it is important for young people to be aware of the need we have in this country to get them more active politically...People respond to things that are shocking."

Alba endorsed and supported Democratic presidential hopeful Barack Obama during the 2008 primary season. She also endorsed Hillary Clinton's campaign for president.

In June 2009, while filming The Killer Inside Me in Oklahoma City, Alba was involved in a controversy with residents when she pasted posters of sharks around town. Alba said that she was trying to bring attention to the diminishing population of great white sharks. Media outlets speculated that Alba would be pursued and charged with vandalism. On June 16, 2009, Oklahoma City police said that they would not pursue criminal charges against Alba, because none of the property owners wanted to pursue it. Alba apologized in a statement to People magazine and said that she regretted her actions. She later donated an undisclosed amount of money (over US$500) to the United Way, whose billboard she had obscured with one of the shark posters.

In 2011, Alba participated in a two-day lobbying effort in Washington D.C. in support of the Safe Chemicals Act, a revision of the Toxic Substances Control Act of 1976. Alba returned to Capitol Hill in 2015 to lobby lawmakers as they once again debated a replacement for the 1976 Substances Control Act. She has also been a strong supporter of gay rights and on June 27, 2013, she expressed her delight with the Supreme Court's decision to strike down DOMA on her Twitter account. She tweeted "#equality #love".

Alba's charity work has included participation with Clothes Off Our Back, Habitat for Humanity, National Center for Missing and Exploited Children, Project HOME, RADD, Revlon Run/Walk for Women, SOS Children's Villages, Soles4Souls, Step Up and Baby2Baby. Alba is an ambassador for the 1Goal movement to provide education to children in Africa. She has also served as a Baby2Baby "angel" ambassador, donating and helping to distribute items such as diapers and clothing to families in Los Angeles.
In 2015, Alba and The Honest Company sponsored a laboratory at Mount Sinai Hospital in New York City. The lab was announced to be a specialized room designed to keep out dust and particles, where a team of epidemiologists would research links between household chemicals and autism.

 Public image 

Alba has received attention for her looks over the years and has been included in several publications' lists of the most attractive celebrities of the time. She was included in Maxim Magazine's Hot 100 list multiple times from 2001 to 2014. On this she has said, "I have to go to certain lengths to use sexuality to my advantage, while guiding people to thinking the way I want them to."
In 2002, she was voted the fifth Sexiest Female Star in a Hollywood.com poll. In 2005, she was named one of People Magazine's 50 Most Beautiful People, and appeared in the magazine's 100 Most Beautiful list in 2007. She has also been named on FHM's Sexiest Women lists.

Alba was named among Playboy magazine's "25 Sexiest Celebrities" in 2006, and appeared on its cover that year. She was involved in litigation against Playboy for its use of her image on this cover (from a promotional shot for Into the Blue) without her consent, which she contended gave the impression that she was featured in the issue in a "nude pictorial". She later dropped the lawsuit after receiving a personal apology from Playboy owner Hugh Hefner, who agreed to make donations to two charities Alba had supported. Also in 2006, readers of AskMen.com voted Alba #1 on its "99 Most Desirable Women" list. In 2007, Alba was ranked No.4 on Empire Magazine's "100 Sexiest Movie Stars". Both GQ and In Style had Alba on their June 2008 covers. She appeared in the 2009 Campari calendar, which featured photos of her posing; Campari printed 9,999 copies of the calendar. In 2011, she was named one of the "100 Hottest Women of All-Time" by Men's Health, and in 2012 People named her one of the year's "Most Beautiful at Every Age".

In 2010, reports surfaced that a 21-year-old Chinese girl was seeking plastic surgery to resemble Alba in order to win back an ex-boyfriend; the star spoke out against the perceived need to change one's appearance for love.

Alba has commented on her fears of being typecast as a sex kitten based on the bulk of parts offered to her. In an interview, Alba said she wanted to be taken seriously as an actress but believed she needed to do movies that she would otherwise not be interested in to build her career, stating that eventually she hoped to be more selective in her film projects.

Alba has been quoted saying she will not do nudity for a role. She was given the option to appear nude in Sin City by the film's directors, Frank Miller and Robert Rodriguez, but declined the offer, saying, "I don't do nudity. I just don't. Maybe that makes me a bad actress. Maybe I won't get hired in some things. But I have too much anxiety". She remarked of a GQ shoot in which she was scantily clad, "They didn't want me to wear the granny panties, but I said, 'If I'm gonna be topless I need to wear granny panties."

 Personal life 
Alba was raised a Catholic throughout her teenage years, but left the church because she felt she was being judged for her appearance, explaining:

Older men would hit on me, and my youth pastor said it was because I was wearing provocative clothing, when I wasn't. It just made me feel like if I was in any way desirable to the opposite sex that it was my fault and it made me ashamed of my body and being a woman.

Alba also had objections to the church's condemnations of premarital sex and homosexuality, and what she saw as a lack of strong female role models in the Bible, explaining: "I thought it was a nice guide, but it certainly wasn't how I was going to live my life." Her "religious devotion [began] to wane" at age 15 when she guest-starred as a teenager with gonorrhea in the throat in a 1996 episode of the television series Chicago Hope. Her friends at church reacted negatively to her role, making her lose faith in the church. However, she has stated that she still holds a belief in God.

While filming Dark Angel in January 2000, Alba began a three-year relationship with her co-star Michael Weatherly. Weatherly proposed to Alba on her 20th birthday, which she accepted. In August 2003, they announced that they had ended their relationship. In July 2007, Alba spoke out about the breakup, saying, "I don't know [why I got engaged]. I was a virgin. He was 12 years older than me. I thought he knew better. My parents weren't happy. They're really religious. They believe God wouldn't allow the Bible to be written if it wasn't what they are supposed to believe. I'm completely different."

Alba met Cash Warren, son of actor Michael Warren, while filming Fantastic Four in 2004. They were married in Los Angeles in May 2008. They have three children: daughters Honor Marie, born in June 2008, and Haven Garner born in August 2011, and a son, Hayes, born in December 2017. The first pictures of her eldest daughter, which appear in the July 2008 issue of OK! magazine, reportedly earned Alba US$1.5 million.

In 2014, Alba appeared in Henry Louis Gates's genealogy series Finding Your Roots'', which documented her learning about her lineage, which was traced back to the ancient Maya civilization. The show's research indicated that her surname was not inherited from a Spanish man, since her father's direct paternal line (Y-DNA) was Haplogroup Q-M3, being Indigenous in origin. Her father's matrilineal line (mtDNA) was Jewish and revealed that lawyer Alan Dershowitz is a genetic relative of hers. Alba's global admixture was 72.7% European, 22.5% East Asian and Native American, 2% Sub-Saharan African, 0.3% Middle Eastern and North African, 0.1% South Asian and 2.4% "No Match".

Filmography

Film

Television

Music videos

Video games

Awards

References

External links 

 
 
 
 

 
1981 births
Living people
20th-century American actresses
21st-century American actresses
Activists from California
Activists from Mississippi
Activists from Texas
Actresses from Los Angeles
Actresses from Mississippi
Actresses from Texas
American actresses of Mexican descent
American child actresses
American company founders
American feminists
American film actresses
American people of Mexican-Jewish descent
American philanthropists
American retail chief executives
American television actresses
American video game actresses
American voice actresses
American women chief executives
American women company founders
Businesspeople from Los Angeles
Businesspeople from Mississippi
Businesspeople from Texas
Businesspeople in online retailing
Former Roman Catholics
Hispanic and Latino American actresses
Hispanic and Latino American feminists
People from Biloxi, Mississippi
People from Claremont, California
People from Del Rio, Texas
People from Pomona, California
People of Maya descent